The following is a list of former districts of the Massachusetts House of Representatives in the United States. Legislative districts for elected representation in the Massachusetts House of Representatives are apportioned based on census information. Apportionment has occurred generally every ten years: in 1857, 1866, 1876, 1886, 1896, 1906, 1916, 1926, 1939, 1947,...2011.

There were no districts before 1857. Representatives were elected from each town and city. The number of House members "fluctuated from a low of 131 members in 1782 to a high of 748 members in 1812." Starting in 1857, 240 House districts were "drawn by county boards on the basis of statutory assignment of seats to each county." A 1974 referendum, supported by the League of Women Voters, reduced the number of seats from 240 to 160.

Former districts

 5th Berkshire district
 6th Berkshire district
 7th Berkshire district
 8th Berkshire district
 9th Berkshire district
 15th Bristol district
 16th Bristol district
 17th Bristol district
 18th Bristol district
 1st Dukes district
 Cape and Islands district
 19th Essex district
 20th Essex district
 21st Essex district
 22nd Essex district
 23rd Essex district
 24th Essex district
 25th Essex district
 26th Essex district
 27th Essex district
 3rd Franklin district
 4th Franklin district
 5th Franklin district
 6th Franklin district
 7th Franklin district
 13th Hampden district
 14th Hampden district
 15th Hampden district
 16th Hampden district
 17th Hampden district
 18th Hampden district
 19th Hampden district
 20th Hampden district
 4th Hampshire district
 5th Hampshire district
 6th Hampshire district
 38th Middlesex district
 39th Middlesex district
 40th Middlesex district
 41st Middlesex district
 42nd Middlesex district
 43rd Middlesex district
 44th Middlesex district
 45th Middlesex district
 46th Middlesex district
 47th Middlesex district
 48th Middlesex district
 49th Middlesex district
 50th Middlesex district
 51st Middlesex district
 52nd Middlesex district
 53rd Middlesex district
 54th Middlesex district
 55th Middlesex district
 56th Middlesex district
 57th Middlesex district
 58th Middlesex district
 59th Middlesex district
 1st Nantucket district
 16th Norfolk district
 17th Norfolk district
 18th Norfolk district
 19th Norfolk district
 20th Norfolk district
 21st Norfolk district
 22nd Norfolk district
 23rd Norfolk district
 24th Norfolk district
 13th Plymouth district
 14th Plymouth district
 15th Plymouth district
 20th Suffolk district
 21st Suffolk district
 22nd Suffolk district
 23rd Suffolk district
 24th Suffolk district
 25th Suffolk district
 26th Suffolk district
 27th Suffolk district
 28th Suffolk district
 29th Suffolk district
 30th Suffolk district
 31st Suffolk district
 19th Worcester district
 20th Worcester district
 21st Worcester district
 22nd Worcester district
 23rd Worcester district
 24th Worcester district
 25th Worcester district
 26th Worcester district
 27th Worcester district
 28th Worcester district
 29th Worcester district
 30th Worcester district

See also
 List of current districts of the Massachusetts House of Representatives
 History of the Massachusetts General Court
 List of Massachusetts General Courts
 List of former districts of the Massachusetts Senate
 Apportionment in US state legislatures

References

Further reading

External links

 

 
Massachusetts-related lists